Overgaden Oven Vandet 50 is a residential property in the Christianshavn neighborhood of central Copenhagen, Denmark. It is one of three properties along Christianshavn Canal that were built by anchor smith Hans Caspersen and are now all known as the Hans Caspersen House, the others being Overgaden Neden Vandet 39 and Overgaden Neden Vandet 33. The building  was completed in 1769 and listed on the Danish registry of protected buildings and places in 1945.

History

Earlier building

The property on the site was listed as No. 97 in Christianshavn Quarter in Copenhagen's first cadastre of 1689. It was at that time owned by ropemaker Verner Wesenduncks (Wesendonch). His house was located in Dronningensgade on the other side of the block. The lot was in 1718 acquired by timber merchant Niels Flesborg (c. 1695-1720s) and used as a lumberyard. The lumberyard was in 1720 ceded to timber merchant and captain Hans Brechvoldt. He had just married Flesborg 's daughter Martha. Brechvoldt and a brother-in-law died in 1744, probably from drowning, leaving Martha Nielsdatter Flesborg Brechtwoldt as the owner of the lumberyard. In 1749, she sold the property to brewer Peder Nielsen Trye Friis. The property was listed as No. 177 in the new cadastre of 1756. In 1755, Friis had divided the property into two lots and sold them individually as on auction. Part of the lumberyard (later referred to as No. 177B) was acquired by merchant and shipowner John Brown. The rest (later referred to as No. 177A, now part of Ovengade Oven Vamdet 50) was sold to dyer Andreas Hegelund.

Hegelund's house is in a fire insurance policy from January 1756 described as a two-storey, timber-framed building constructed on a brick cellar. It was via a staircase in oak timber attached to a side wing with kitchen and workshop. A combined wagonhouse and stable with room for three horses was situated on the rear of the property towards Dronningensgade. Andreas Hegelund's widow Elisabeth Sophie married Gottfried August Neukammer.

Hans Caspersen and the new building

On 25 June 1765, Neukammer sold the property to anchor smith Hans Caspersen. Caspersen's old property at Overgaden Neden Vandet 39 had recently been destroyed by fire. He demolished the existing buildings and constructed a new four-storey apartment building on the land in the 1760s.1765-69.

Munch, Bishop and Malcolm
Hans Caspersen sold the property to Oluf Munch shortly after its completion but seems to have kept an apartment in the building. He lived there until 1782 when he returned to his other property at Overgaden Neden Vandet 39.

In 1778, Overgaden Oven Vandet 50 was sold to the Scottish ship captain Arthur Bishop. Gis widow  Alison Bishop was later married to Alexander Malcolm, a ship's master born at Kirkcaldy, Scotland.

In the 1801 census, Alison Malcolm is listed as a widow living with her son James Bishop in the building. In the 
neighbouring house, Captain James Ogilvie resided in one of the apartments with his young wife Mary Anne Bishop, who could have been Alison's daughter.

The property was listed as No. 179 in the new cadastre of 1806. It was at that time owned by a widow named Malcolm.

Lauritz Nicolai Hvidt], 181152
In 1811, Lauritz Nicolai Hvidt purchased the property. He kept it until 1852. In 1812, he also purchased the property at Kronprinsessegade 28 and lived there until his death. He did this not himself live in the building in Christianshavn.

The property was home to three households at the 1840 census. Niels Severin Müller (1776-), a merchant (grosserer), resided on the ground floor with his wife Marie K. Poulsen and one maid. Dorothea Catharina Olsen, widow of a distiller, resided on the second floor with her daughter Oline Charlotte Cecilia Olsen, governess Clara Theodora Hansen Gjersing	 (in wine merchant Hansen's household) and one maid. Frederik Wind Schneider, a book printer, resided on the third floor with his wife Karen Elisabeth /née Kofoed) and one maid.

The jurist and author Hans Egede Schack (1820-1859 was a resident in the building in 1845. He was a member of Folketinget in 1850-1853 and would later serve as secretary for the prime ministers P. G. Bang (1797-1861), C. G. Andræ (1812-1893) andC. C. Hall (1812-1888). He published the novel Fantasterne in December 1857.

Olsen family, 1850s1880s

The property was later acquired by oil miller Peter Christian Olsen (1808-1872). In 1847, he had established an oil mill in Rorvegade (No. 51, demolished). His property was home to 31 residents at the 1860 census. Olsen resided on the two lower floors with his wife Ane Maren Aceline /née Giessing), their three sons (aged 18 to 27), a housekeeper and a maid. Niels Peter Carl Theodor Bruus, a military officer with rank of captain, resided on the second floor with his wife Cathrine Christine (née Stochfledt) and one maid. Frederik Seehusen, a master joiner, resided on the third floor with his wife Laura Thomine Henriette (née Jørgensen), their seven children (aged six to 28), one maid and two joiner's apprentices. Werdech Hagemann, a seaman, resided in the basement with his wife Emma Rasmine (née Petersen), their five children aged one to six), his father-in-law Andreas Petersen and the father-in-law's wife Mette Petersen (née Sørensen).

The property and oil mill in Torvegade were after Peter Christian Olsen passed to his widow. In 1767, she ceded the oil mil to her son Alfred Olsen (1843-1900). He had married Thora Seehusen, daughter of master joiner Frederik Seehusen on the third floor (cf. the 1860 census).

The property was home to a total of 22 residents in five households at the 1880 census. Ane Marie Axeline Olsen resided on the two lower floors with her son Morten Olsen	(farmer) and two granddaughters (aged 13 and 17), a housekeeper and a maid. Alfred Olsen resided on the second floor with his wife Thora Mathilde (née Seehusen) and one maid. Frederik Nielsen, a professor of church history and later Bishop of Aalborg, resided on the third floor with his wife Katrine Marie Magdalene Nielsen (née Groth( and one maid. Laurine Cathrine Brorson (née Velschowm 1796–1884), widow of merchant (hørkræmmer) Johannes Massenius Brorson (1802-1871), resided on the fourth floor with four of her children (aged 31 to 48= and one maid. Niels Andreas Olsen, a retailer, resided in the basement with his wife Johanne Ariane Marie Olsen (née Nissen), their daughter Henriette Christine Schmidt (née Olsen) and their son Christian Theobald Olsen.

Architecture
The building consists of four storeys over a raised cellar and is topped by a Mansard roof. It is seven bays wide and his a three-bay central projection. The gateway in the left-hand side of the building is topped by a fanlight and the Keystone features a relief of an ancher and an inscription.

Cultural references
The building is used as a location in the 1953 feature film Kriminalsagen Tove Andersen.

List of owners
 1689 matr. 97 Verner Weendunchs Dronningensgade
 1689 matr. 98 Bertel Stywer's indhegnede plads
 1718-1720s Niels Flesborg,
 1720-1733 Hans Brechtwoldt
 1733-1749 Martha Nielsdatter Flesborg Brechtwoldt
 1749-1750 Peter Nielsen Trye Friis
 1755-1788 John Brown
 1755-1765 Andreas Hegelund and Elisabeth Sophie/Gottfried August Neuhammer
 1765-1776 Hans Caspersen
 1776-1778 Oluf Munch
 1778-1811 Arthur Bishop, enken Alison gift anden gang med Alexander Malcom
 1811 Agent Joachim Israel Behrend
 1811-1852  Lauritz Nicolai Hvidt

Gallery

References

External links

Buildings and structures in Christianshavn
Listed residential buildings in Copenhagen
Buildings and structures completed in 1769